Camden is a village in Schuyler County, Illinois, United States. The population was 97 at the 2000 census.

Geography

Demographics

As of the census of 2000, there were 97 people, 38 households, and 25 families residing in the village. The racial makeup of the village was 100.00% White.

There were 38 households, out of which 31.6% had children under the age of 18 living with them, 57.9% were married couples living together, 5.3% had a female householder with no husband present, and 31.6% were non-families. 28.9% of all households were made up of individuals, and 10.5% had someone living alone who was 65 years of age or older. The average household size was 2.55 and the average family size was 3.15.

In the village, the population was spread out, with 27.8% under the age of 18, 8.2% from 18 to 24, 30.9% from 25 to 44, 20.6% from 45 to 64, and 12.4% who were 65 years of age or older. The median age was 34 years. For every 100 females, there were 125.6 males. For every 100 females age 18 and over, there were 112.1 males.

The median income for a household in the village was $26,250, and the median income for a family was $34,375. Males had a median income of $20,556 versus $17,500 for females. The per capita income for the village was $9,981. There were 24.1% of families and 33.3% of the population living below the poverty line, including 33.3% of under eighteens and 11.1% of those over 65 years of age.

References

Villages in Schuyler County, Illinois
Villages in Illinois